is a 2012 Japanese film directed by Yukihiko Tsutsumi starring the members of Japanese boy band Kanjani Eight.

Cast
You Yokoyama
Subaru Shibutani
Shingo Murakami
Ryuhei Maruyama
Shota Yasuda
Ryo Nishikido
Tadayoshi Okura
Hiroshi Tachi
Renji Ishibashi
Ryuhei Ueshima
Becky
Misako Renbutsu
Ryosei Tayama
Hitomi Takahashi
Naoto Takenaka
Noriyuki Higashiyama

See also
Kanjani Sentai Eight Ranger

References

External links
Eight Ranger Official Website

Films directed by Yukihiko Tsutsumi
2012 films
Toho films
Films set in the future
Kanjani Eight
2010s Japanese films